Nakhtel is wireless CDMA operator of Nakhchivan Autonomous Republic, Azerbaijan. The company is the fourth GSM operator in Azerbaijan .

NAXTEL Limited Company was founded in July 2015 in Nakhchivan. "NAXTEL" is a 4th generation GSM + LTE operator. It operates on the basis of its charter and license No. 0001503 dated September 7, 2015 by the Ministry of Communications and New Technologies of Nakhchivan Autonomous Republic. Currently, the entire Nakhchivan Autonomous Republic is covered by 118 base stations. Fiber optic cable lines were laid between each base station and the Central Management System, and equipment capable of carrying 1GB of data per second was installed. NAXTEL 4G mobile network uses all three frequency ranges of 800 Mhz, 900 Mhz and 1800 Mhz. It is also ideally designed for subscribers. National and international roaming connections of NAXTEL 4G operate in more than 10 countries of the world. This includes voice, data and SMS services.

References

External links
 Official Website

Mobile phone companies of Azerbaijan
Azerbaijani brands
Companies based in Baku
Azerbaijani companies established in 2014
Technology companies established in 2014